Latvia women's national floorball team is the national team of Latvia. At the 1997 Floorball Women's World Championship in Godby and Mariehamn, Åland, Finland, the team finished seventh. At the 1999 Floorball Women's World Championship in Borlänge, Sweden, the team finished seventh in the A-Division. At the 2001 Floorball Women's World Championship in Riga, Latvia, the team finished sixth in the A-Division. At the 2003 Floorball Women's World Championship in Germany, the team finished sixth in the A-Division. At the 2005 Floorball Women's World Championship in Singapore, the team finished fifth in the A-Division. At the 2007 Floorball Women's World Championship in Frederikshavn, Denmark, the team finished fourth in the A-Division.

References 

Women's national floorball teams
Floorball